The 1949 Green Bay Packers season was their 31st season overall and their 29th season in the National Football League. The team finished with a 2–10 record under coach Curly Lambeau for a fifth-place finish in the Western Conference. This was the 31st and final season the Packers played under Lambeau, who resigned and then coached the Chicago Cardinals in 1950 and 1951 and the Washington Redskins in 1952 and 1953.

The 1949 season was also the final year for blue and gold jerseys, as the Packers switched to kelly green and yellow in 1950 under new coach Gene Ronzani, a graduate of Marquette University.

Offseason

NFL draft

Regular season

Schedule

Standings

Roster

Awards, records, and honors

References

 Sportsencyclopedia.com

Green Bay Packers seasons
Green Bay Packers
Green